The 1964 Danish 3rd Division (Danish: Danmarksturneringens 3. division 1964) was the twenty-third season of the Danish third-tier association football division since its establishment in 1936 as part of the Danmarksturneringen's nation-wide league structure. Governed by the Danish FA, the season was launched on 26 March 1964 with two fixtures and concluded with the last four matches on 15 November 1964. Skovshoved IF and Hellerup IK entered as relegated teams from last season's second division, while Svendborg fB and Nakskov BK entered as promoted teams from the 1963 Kvalifikationsturneringen. The twelve teams in the division entered the 1964–65 Danish Cup in the cup tournament's first round proper.

Holbæk B&IF won the league, securing their first third-tier league title on the last match day, while gaining promotion to the second division for the first time in the club's history, with AIA becoming the runners-up and returning to the second-tier after two years absence. The two clubs with the fewest points in the final league standings, Skovshoved IF and Kolding IF, were relegated to the 1965 Kvalifikationsturneringen. Forward Flemming Jensen of IK Skovbakken was the league's top goal scorer with 18 goals, scoring four goals on the last match day, one more than Fritz Hansen of BK Frem Sakskøbing that finished in second place.

Summary
The 1964 season of the third tier was inaugurated on 26 March with two Maundy Thursday matches, namely Lyngby BK against AIA at Lyngby Stadium in front of 1,100 spectators and newly relegated Hellerup IK versus IK Skovbakken, that finished the previous season in the league's third place just outside the promotion spots, at Gentofte Stadium. The second match was played following the conclusion of the first match of the top-flight league season at the same stadium. The first match day, scheduled to take place over the course of three Easter days, was marked by frost at night and snow and thaw during the day, forcing two matches to be rescheduled to another day and one match to be moved from the morning to afternoon on the same day. The first goal of the season was a penalty kick executed by Lyngby BK's centre forward Per Holger Hansen in the 35th minute — the penalty was awarded due to a tackle committed by AIA's right back Kaj Nielsen against Lyngby BK's left innerwing Knud Christensen. The first hat-trick of the season was netted by IK Chang Aalborg's Erik Sørensen in the 5–0 home win on 30 March at Aalborg Stadium against Skovshoved IF.

Additional under-18 youth players from Lyngby Boldklub's 1962 Danish Youth Championship winning team (Ynglinge-DM; 4–1 win against Kjøbenhavns BK in the final) joined the club's senior men's team at the beginning of the season — seven players from the same youth team had already joined the senior ranks last season. The Kongens Lyngby-based team hence featured the youngest squad in the Danmarksturneringen with an average age of 19½ years. The club managed to win their first four games; 2–0 against AIA, 6–2 against Roskilde BK, 6–1 against Kolding IF and 1–0 against BK Frem Sakskøbing, positioning themselves in one of the top spots of the league standings following the conclusion of the spring season. However, they could not keep their momentum and was overtaken by AIA, which had lost their first two league matches, during the spring season.

Holbæk B&IF secured their promotion on matchday 20 and the league title on the last matchday with a 5–3 home win over Kolding IF on 15 November. Arbejdernes Idrætsklub Aarhus (AIA) was the second team to gain promotion to the second tier. Skovshoved IF experienced their third relegation in the previous four seasons, ending the season in the second last spot following a 5–2 loss in the last match against IK Skovbakken at Riisvangen Stadium. IK Skovbakken's forward Flemming Jensen scored four goals on the final matchday against Skovshoved IF to clinch the league's top-scoring title, pushing BK Frem Sakskøbing's Fritz Hansen's 17 goals to a second place. Kolding IF finished the season in the last spot, returning to the fourth division after having played four seasons in the third tier.

Despite playing for a club at the third tier, Hellerup IK's international footballer, centre forward and national team captain Ole Madsen was named Danish Football Player of the Year in late October 1964.

Teams

Twelve teams competed in the league – eight teams from the previous season, two teams relegated from the second tier and two teams promoted from the fourth tier. The promoted teams were Svendborg fB, who entered the third-tier league for the first time in the club's history, and Nakskov BK, returning after a four-year absence. They replaced KFUM København and BK Rødovre, ending their third-tier spells of two and three years respectively. The relegated teams were Skovshoved IF, experiencing their second relegation in three years, and Hellerup IK, returning after a three-year absence, replacing Hvidovre IF, who got promoted to the second-tier for the first time, and Næstved IF, who returned to the second division, ending their three-year spell in the third-tier.

Stadiums and locations

Personnel

Coaching changes

League table
Every team played two games against the other teams, at home and away, totaling 22 games each. Teams received two points for a win and one point for a draw. If two or more teams were tied on points, places were determined by goal average. The team with the most points were crowned winners of the league. The winners and the runners-up were promoted to the 1965 Danish 2nd Division, while the two teams with the fewest points would be relegated to the 1965 Kvalifikationsturneringen.

Results

Statistics

Scoring

Top scorers

Hat-tricks

Discipline

Player
 Most warnings: 1
  Poul Pedersen (AIA) against Lyngby BK on 26 March
  Donny Vollertsen (Skovshoved IF) against IK Chang Aalborg on 29 March
  Bjarne Jensen (IK Chang Aalborg) against Skovshoved IF on 29 March
  Palle Reimer (Roskilde BK) against Kolding IF on 3 May

References

1963–64 in European third tier association football leagues
1964–65 in European third tier association football leagues
1963–64 in Danish football
1964–65 in Danish football